The Baltimore Polytechnic Institute, colloquially referred to as BPI, Poly, and The Institute, is a U.S. public high school  founded in 1883. Established as an all-male manual trade / vocational school by the Baltimore City Council and the Baltimore City Public Schools, it is now a coeducational academic institution that emphasizes sciences, technology, engineering, and mathematics (STEM). It is located on a  tract of land in North Baltimore on the east bank of the Jones Falls stream. BPI and the adjacent Western High School are located on the same campus.

History 
BPI was founded in 1883, after Joshua Plaskitt petitioned the Baltimore City authorities to establish a school for instruction in engineering. The original school was named the Baltimore Manual Training School, and its first class was made up of about sixty students, all of whom were male. The official name of the school was changed in the 1893 to "The Baltimore Polytechnic Institute" by the  Baltimore City Board of School Commissioners. The first principals were Dr. Richard Grady, Lt. John D. Ford (U.S.N.), and Lieutenant William King (U.S.N.), after whom one of the three main campus buildings – King Memorial Hall was named in the  1980s. The first building was located on the former site of the old central City Spring on Courtland Street just north of East Saratoga Street of which the area was later contained in Baltimore's first "urban renewal" plan with the tearing down of five  square blocks of houses along Courtland and Saint Paul Streets to the west and the construction of Preston Gardens and Saint Paul Place from East Lexington Street to East Centre Street in the north in 1923. The former BMTS / BPI building (and earlier elementary school dating back to the 1840s) became home to the Baltimore City Department of Welfare and was later annexed by neighboring Mercy Hospital (formerly named Baltimore City Hospital) on North Calvert and Saratoga Streets to the east and later torn down for construction of their first hospital tower in 1964. In 1983, at the school's centennial observation, a historical plaque was placed in the lobby of the hospital commemorating that earlier first home of the Manual Training School for 30 years, later to become "Poly". It just so happened in an amazing coincidence, that this building was across the street and 44 years later, almost a half-century after their long-time rival public high school The Baltimore City College ("City") was established in a row house in 1839 for a few short years, also on the now vanished narrow alley-like Courtland Street.

, between North Calvert Street and Guilford Avenue to the east.

Relocation 
Due to continued growth of the student population of the BCPS and especially  in the growing demand for higher secondary education at high schools like at BPI and BCC and the girls schools, the technical school relocated in 1913 to Calvert Street and North Avenue. The former  1860s converted  mansion of the Maryland School for the Blind was purchased sitting on a slight hill and two massive wings on the east and west sides were added with  a Greek Revival style columns  on the front facade. For the first time in its 30 years history "Tech" had a suitable building expansive enough to handle both its academic and technical education requirements. By 1930, the old original central wing of "The Mansion" was razed and replaced by a simpler center wing between the two flanking 1913 structures with an additional large enormous auditorium/gymnasium  wing further to the east facing North Avenue were constructed. This massive assembly hall was the largest at the time in the city and  served many secular/civic/cultural occasions and events for decades into the mid-1980s. While at this location, the school expanded both its academic, technical  and athletic programs under the extensive longtime supervision of Dr. Wilmer Dehuff, who was fourth principal from 1921 to 1958 and reluctantly (see below) oversaw the racial integration of the school in 1952, the first instance in City of Baltimore public schools with admitting African-American/then called "Negro" – "Colored" students and two years before the rest of the nation took up this serious issue of discrimination  addressed finally by the Supreme Court of the United States in May 1954 in the famous  case of Brown vs. Board of Education of Topeka, Kansas. Previous  black students had attended  Frederick Douglass High School (formerly the "Colored High School" – second oldest in the nation – founded the same year as Poly – 1883) and the Paul Laurence Dunbar High School Dehuff later served after his 37 years career at Poly, as the president and dean of faculty at the University of Baltimore on Mount Royal Avenue.

Integration/desegregation 
Most Baltimore City public schools were not integrated until after the Supreme Court decision in Brown v. Board of Education. BPI had an unusually advanced and difficult college engineering "A" preparatory curriculum which included calculus, analytical chemistry, electricity, mechanics and surveying; these subjects were not offered at the black high schools in the city before 1952. BPI was a whites-only school but supported by taxes on the general population. No black schools in the city (black students could not attend whites-only schools) offered such courses, nor did they have classrooms, labs, libraries or teachers comparable to those at BPI  or Baltimore City College. Because of this, a group of 16 African American students, with help and support from their parents, the Baltimore Urban League, and the NAACP, applied for the engineering "A" course at the Poly; the applications were denied and the students sued.

The subsequent trial began on June 16, 1952. The NAACP's intentions were to end segregation at the 50-year-old public high school. In the BPI case they argued that BPI's offerings of specialized engineering courses violated the "separate but equal" clause because these courses were not offered in high schools for black students. To avoid integration, an out-of-court proposal was made to the Baltimore City school board to start an equivalent "A" course at the "colored" (for non-whites) Frederick Douglass High School. The hearing on the "Douglass" plan lasted for hours, with Dehuff and others arguing that separate but equal "A" courses would satisfy constitutional requirements and NAACP attorney Thurgood Marshall arguing that the plan was a gamble and cost the city should not take. By a vote of 5–3, the board decided that a separate "A" course would not provide the same educational opportunities for African American students, and that, starting that fall, African American students could attend Poly. The vote vindicated the NAACP national strategy of raising the cost of 'separate but equal' schools beyond what taxpayers were willing to pay. Thirteen African American students, Leonard Cephas, Carl Clark, William Clark, Milton Cornish, Clarence Daly, Victor Dates, Alvin Giles, Bucky Hawkins, Linwood Jones, Edward Savage, Everett Sherman, Robert Young, and Silas Young, finally entered the school that fall. They were faced daily with racial epithets, threats of violence and isolation from many of the more than 2,000 students at the school. The first of those students to graduate from Poly was Dr. Carl O. Clark in 1955. Dr. Clark went on to become the first African-American to graduate from the University of South Carolina with a degree in physics in 1976.

Modern campus (1960s–present) 

In 1967, then-principal Claude Burkert (1958–1969) oversaw the relocation of his school to its current location at 1400 West Cold Spring Lane, a fifty-three-acre tract of land bordering Falls Road and Roland Park. Also occupying this site is the Western High School, an all-girls school founded in 1844. Notable buildings on the campus include Dehuff Hall, also known as the academic building, where students attend normal classes, and Burkert Hall, also called the engineering building, where students attend classes in the Willard Hackerman Engineering Program. Both Western High School and Poly students make use of the auditorium/cafeteria complex, and likewise share the swimming pool and sports fields. Although the two schools share these facilities, their respective academic programs and classrooms are completely separate from one another.

In 1974, Poly officially became coeducational when it began admitting female students. The first female to enroll and successfully graduate from the "A" course was an African-American named Cindy White (1974–1978). In the late 1980s, the title "principal" was changed to "director." After the retirement of Director John Dohler in 1990, Barbara Stricklin became the first woman to head the school, as she accepted the title of Interim Director.

During Director Ian Cohen's tenure (1994–2003), Poly's curriculum was again expanded when it began offering Advanced placement (AP) classes.  During the 2001–2002 school year, Poly was recognized by the Maryland State Department of Education when it was named a "Blue Ribbon School of Excellence." In 2011, Poly was ranked 1552 nationally and 44 in Maryland as a "Silver Medal School" by U.S. News & World Report.

In 2004, Dr. Barney Wilson, a 1976 Poly graduate, became Baltimore Polytechnic Institute's first African-American director. In August 2010, assistant principal Matthew Woolston, was appointed interim director. Later on during the year, Jacqueline Williams was appointed as interim director for the 2011–2012 school year. By the end of the school year – and after a two-year, nationwide search – Williams became the first female director of the institution. Williams worked her way through the Poly ranks from student (Class of 1981), to teacher, then department head, to assistant principal, and to dean of students, before appointment to her current position as director.

Academics 
Poly is a magnet school with specialized courses drawing students from across Baltimore's regular district boundaries. Admission to the school is highly competitive. Course concentrations include: the Honors STEM Program; the Ingenuity Project offering advanced science, math, and academic research courses; AP Capstone emphasizing Social Sciences and Humanities; Computer Science; and Air Force JROTC. In its 2019 nationwide survey of STEM programs spanning 2015–2019, Newsweek ranked Poly #36 among US high schools.

Athletics 

In addition to the school's football program, Poly's sports include basketball, soccer, cross-country, track and field, lacrosse, baseball, hockey, swimming, tennis, volleyball, and wrestling. The boys' basketball team won three state championship titles in a row between 2016 and 2019. The Poly Engineers baseball team has won nine Baltimore City championships since 2005 under head coach Corey Goodwin.

Football 
Since the early 1900s the Engineers, along with City College, had dominated the Maryland Scholastic Association (MSA) football scene. However, since joining the MPSSAA in 1993, Poly made it to the final game once in 1993, the semifinals once in 1997 and the quarterfinals in 1994 and 1998.

Poly and City 

The Poly-City football rivalry is the oldest American football rivalry in Maryland and one of the oldest public school rivalries in the U.S.—predated by the rivalry between the Boston Latin School and the English High School of Boston. The rivalry began in 1889, when a team from Baltimore City College (City) met a team from the Baltimore Polytechnic Institute (Poly), and has continued annually. City leads the series with the record standing at 63–62–6.

Early years 
Little is known of the first American football game between Baltimore Polytechnic Institute (Poly) and Baltimore City College (City) in 1889, except that a JV team from Poly met City, in Clifton Park and City emerged the victor.  That began the oldest football rivalry in Maryland. City continued to win against Poly through 1901, however in 1902, for the only time in history of the series no game was played; though, in 1931, an extra game was played to compensate.  Between 1903 and 1906, City won the series, but the tide turned in 1907, when the first tie in the series occurred.  The next year Poly scored its first victory in the rivalry.

1910s and 1920s 
Poly dominated the series in the 1910s.  The only year of the decade that City won was 1912, and between 1914 and 1917, Poly shut out City. Poly's streak continued through 1921, completing a nine-year winning streak, which City broke in 1922 with a 27–0 victory.

In 1926, one of the most famous Poly-City games was played.  Prior to the game, the eligibility of City's halfback, Mickey Noonen, was challenged.  A committee was formed to investigate Noonen's eligibility, but Noonen's father—frustrated with the investigation—struck one of the members of the committee.  The result was that Noonen was not only barred from the team, but also expelled from the Baltimore City school system.  In spite of Noonen's removal, the two teams met at the Baltimore Stadium with 20,000 fans in attendance.  The game remained scoreless well into the fourth quarter.  Finally, Poly's Harry Lawrence—who later became a coach at City—kicked a successful field goal from the 30-yard leading to a 3–0 victory over City.

1930s and 1940s 
The 1930s ushered in a period of resurgence for the City team.  Poly, which had dominated in the previous two decades, only picked up two wins in the 1930s.  In 1934, Harry Lawrence, who had kicked the winning field goal against City in 1926, became the head coach at his former rival.  Lawrence led City to a series of victories over Poly through the 1930s and early 1940s.  In 1944, the game, which had been played on the Saturday following Thanksgiving, was moved to Thanksgiving Day.  The change was the result of a scheduling conflict with the Army–Navy Game. The game remained on Thanksgiving Day for nearly 50 years.

Lumsden and Young: 1950s and 1960s 
Poly won five straight games against City to open the 1950s, and 9 of the decade's 10 games, under legendary coach Bob Lumsden, for whom the school's current football stadium is named. Lumsden finished with an 11–7 record against City when he retired as head coach in 1966. He also coached 9–0 Poly to the unofficial National High School Championship Game at Miami's Orange Bowl in 1962, against the Miami High Stingarees, but Poly lost by a score of 14–6. The team's fortunes changed later in the 1960s, when City was coached by George Young. Young guided his teams to six wins over Poly, and an equal number of Maryland Scholastic Association championships. One of Young's most memorable victories occurred on Thanksgiving Day, 1965, at Memorial Stadium, when undefeated City beat undefeated Poly 52–6.

1970s–present 
Poly controlled the series throughout the 1970s, and well into the 1980s. City lost a total of 17 consecutive games to Poly, before winning the 99th meeting between the two programs in 1987. Poly's dominance during this period is the longest winning streak in the series. City also went on to win the historic 100th showdown a year later, before Poly got on another roll, starting with the 101st clash in 1989 winning the game 36–8. Poly won the 102nd meeting 27–0.

Baltimore City's public schools withdrew from the Maryland State Athletic Association, in 1993, and joined the Maryland Public Secondary Schools Athletic Association (MPSSAA). This change meant that the football season would end earlier, forcing Poly and City to move their game from Thanksgiving Day to the first Saturday in November. Poly and City met for the 119th time in November 2007, a contest marred by the outbreak of a large brawl outside M&T Bank Stadium after the final whistle. Poly and City met for the 120th time on November 8, 2008. Baltimore Polytechnic Institute and Baltimore City College then met for the 121st time on November 7, 2009, with the score of 26–20. Poly and City met for the 122nd time on November 6, 2010. As of the 2018 game, City had won the prior 7 contests.

Basketball
In February 2020, ESPN ranked the boys basketball team in the top 25 in the country.

Principals/Directors 

 Dr. Richard Grady (1883–1886)
 Lt. John D. Ford (1886–1890)
 Lieutenant William King (1890–1921)
 Dr. Wilmer Dehuff (1921–1958)
 Claude Burkert (1958–1969)
 William Gerardi (1969–1980)
 Zeney Jacobs (1980–1984)
 Gary Thrift (1984–1985)
 John Dohler (1985–1990)
 Barbara Stricklin^ (1990–1991)
 Dr. Albert Strickland (1991–1994)
 Ian Cohen (1994–2003)
 Sharon Kanter^ (2003–2004)
 Dr. Barney Wilson (2004–2010)
 Matthew Woolston^ (2010–2011)
 Jacqueline Williams (2011–present)

^ Denotes interim director while a search for a permanent director was occurring or ongoing at the time

Notable alumni

Arts, literature, and entertainment 
 H. L. Mencken, 1896 – Writer
 Stavros Halkias - Comedian/Host of Cumtown
 Jae Deal – Hollywood Composer/Producer
 William J. Murray – Son of atheist Madalyn Murray O'Hair
 Edward Wilson – British writer of spy novels
 Ta-Nehisi Coates – writer
 Dashiell Hammett – writer
 Alex Scally - Guitarist of dream-pop band Beach House

Business 
 Alonzo G. Decker, Jr., 1926 – former chairman, Black and Decker Corporation.

Education 

 John Corcoran, PhD, DHC, 1956 – logician, philosopher, mathematician, historian of logic.
 Rev. Joseph Allan Panuska, S.J., 1945 – president of the University of Scranton (1982–1998), academic vice president and dean of faculties at Boston College (1979–1982), provincial of the seven state Maryland Province of the Society of Jesus (1973–1979), a biology professor and director of the Jesuit community at Georgetown University (1963–1973), and Jesuit priest.
 Raynard S. Kington, MD, PhD, president of Grinell College.

Government

Judicial branch 
 William "Billy" Murphy Jr. – Baltimore City Circuit Court.

Legislative branch

 Anthony Ambridge, 1969 – (D), Councilman, District 2, Baltimore City, (1983–1996).
 Thomas L. Bromwell, 1967 – (D), Maryland State Senator, District 8, Baltimore County, (1983–2002).
 Andrew J. Burns Jr., 1945 – (D), Maryland State Delegate, District 43, Baltimore City (1967–1982).
 Luke Clippinger, 1990 – (D), Maryland State Delegate, District 46, Baltimore City (2011–present)
 Cornell Dypski, 1950 – (D), Maryland State Delegate, District 46, Baltimore City (1987–2003).
 Edward Garmatz – U.S. Congressman representing Maryland's 3rd District, (1947–1973).
 Joe Hayes (1988), member of the Alaska House of Representatives (2001–2003).
 A. Wade Kach – 1966  (R) Maryland State Delegate, (1975–2014), Baltimore County Councilman, (2014–present), US Presidential Elector (1972)
 Clarence M. Mitchell, IV – (D), Maryland State Senator, District 39, Baltimore City, (1999–2003).
 Nick J. Mosby, 1997 – (D), Councilman, District 7, Baltimore City, (2011–present).
 Charles E. Sydnor III, 1992 – (D), Maryland State Delegate, District 44B, Baltimore County (2015–present)
 George W. Wiland – U.S. Congressional Constituent Representative, (R), OK-1, (2001–present), U.S. Presidential Elector, (2000).

Military 
 Alfred J. Stewart, 1977 - Brigadier General, United States Air Force
 James A. Sagerholm, 1946 - Vice Admiral, United States Navy
 George E. Voelker, 1968 - Rear Admiral, United States Navy
 Paul J. Wiedorfer, 1939 – Won Medal of Honor at Battle of the Bulge.
 Brian Cavanaugh, 1986 - Lieutenant General, United States Marine Corps

Sciences 
 Don L. Anderson – Geophysicist, winner of the Crafoord Prize and the National Medal of Science.
 John Clauser - Winner of the 2022 Nobel Prize for Physics.
 Scarlin Hernandez (2008)- spacecraft engineer working on the James Webb Space Telescope at the Space Telescope Science Institute.
 John Rettaliata – Fluid dynamicist, former president at Illinois Institute of Technology.
 Robert H. Roy – mechanical engineer, dean of engineering and science at Johns Hopkins University.
 Robert Ulanowicz (1961) – noted theoretical ecologist at the University of Maryland Center for Environmental Science's Chesapeake Biological Laboratory

Sports 
 Antonio Freeman, 1990 – former wide receiver for the Green Bay Packers, and Philadelphia Eagles
 Greg Kyler – former wide receiver/defensive back in the Arena Football League
 Harry Lawrence, 1927 – head football coach at Baltimore City College (1934–1941, 1946) and Bucknell University (1947–1957)
 Justin Lewis, 2020 – current forward for the Chicago Bulls of the National Basketball Association (NBA)
 Jim Ostendarp – former National Football League (NFL) player and head coach at Amherst College for 33 years from 1959 to 1991
 Mike Pitts, 1978 – played 12 seasons at defensive end for the Atlanta Falcons, Philadelphia Eagles, and New England Patriots 
 Jack Scarbath – former quarterback for the Washington Redskins and Pittsburgh Steelers, enshrined in College Football Hall of Fame in 1983 for All-American career at Maryland
 Greg Schaum – former defensive lineman with the Dallas Cowboys and New England Patriots
 Ricardo Silva, 2006 – former NFL safety
 Jack Turnbull – three-time Johns Hopkins All-American and 1932 Olympic lacrosse player, 1936 Olympic field hockey player, and World War II fighter pilot
 Justin Wells, 2006 – current guard for the Arena Football League
 LaQuan Williams, 2006 – former wide receiver for the Baltimore Ravens
 Elmer Wingate – former defensive end for the Baltimore Colts, All-American in both football and lacrosse at the University of Maryland, College Park

School songs and hymns
Poly Fight Song
Polytechnic Hymn, written by James Sagerholm, Class of 1946:

References

Footnotes

Sources 
 
 
 
Templeton, Furman L. “The Admission of Negro Boys to the Baltimore Polytechnic Institute ‘A’ Course.” Journal of Negro Education 23(1) (Winter 1954)
Thomsen, Roszel C. “The Integration of Baltimore’s Polytechnic Institute: A Reminiscence.” Maryland Historical Magazine 79 (Fall 1984)

External links
 

NCSSS schools
Educational institutions established in 1883
Public high schools in Maryland
Magnet schools in Maryland
Public schools in Baltimore
Middle States Commission on Secondary Schools
1883 establishments in Maryland